Hill Hall is an Elizabethan mansion located in Theydon Mount near Epping, Essex, England. Although owned by English Heritage, the building consists of many private apartments. It is a grade I listed building.

The importance of Hill Hall lies in two features. Firstly, it has some of the earliest classical decoration on any surviving building in Britain - the tiers of columns and friezes on the courtyard walls and the use of 'giant' column (that is, rising through two storeys) on the exterior facades. Secondly, the 1969 fire destroyed most of the interiors but not, miraculously, a series of wall paintings on the first floor completed more or less when the house was built in the late 16th century. There are an unusual survival of classically inspired mural paintings.

History
The house was originally built for Sir Thomas Smith during the reign of Elizabeth I to replace a 12th-century house on the same site. Construction was carried out over several intervals (1567-8, 1572–3) interspersed between Smith's stints as ambassador to France. The hall stands in 50 hectares (120 acres) of parkland designed by Humphrey Repton.

The Smith, later Bowyer-Smyth, family remained in occupation until the mid 19th century.

Hill Hall subsequently became a prisoner of war camp during World War 2.  Pregnant women from the east end of London were also evacuated from London during the early part of World Ward II and babies were also born there.  Later, Hill Hall became a women's prison until a fire in 1969. It has since become part of the Heritage Trust. Limited tours are available to see the internal period wall paintings described by Croft-Murray of the British Museum as the most important survival of Elizabethan decorative figure painting in England.

According to local legend, Hill Hall was once the site of a duel between seven brothers, for the hand of a beautiful girl. Every brother was killed. It is also allegedly the haunt of a phantom black dog.

References

External links

 

Country houses in Essex
Elizabethan architecture
English Heritage sites in Essex
Epping Forest District
Grade I listed buildings in Essex
Grade I listed houses
Grade II listed parks and gardens in Essex
Historic house museums in Essex
Houses completed in 1575